Pullashakti was Shilahara  ruler of north Konkan branch from 825 CE – 850 CE.

Kapardin I  was succeeded by his son Pullashakti who has left a much-abraded inscription in Kanheri cave No. 73. In the Kanheri cave inscription Pullashakti is called Mahasamanta and is described as the lord of Puri-Konkan a, which he had obtained by the favour of the Rashtrakuta king Amoghavarsha I. The inscription records the endowment of 24 dramas made by one Vishnugupta for the repairs of the cave as well as for the raiment and books of the monks dwelling in Krishnagiri (Kanheri).(Dept. Gazetteer: 2002)

See also
 Shilahara

References
 Bhandarkar R.G. (1957): Early History of Deccan, Sushil Gupta (I) Pvt Ltd, Calcutta.
 Fleet J.F (1896): "The Dynasties of the Kanarese District of The Bombay Presidency", written for The Bombay Gazetteer.
 Department of Gazetteer, Govt of Maharashtra (2002): Itihaas : Prachin Kal, Khand -1 (Marathi)
 Department of Gazetteer, Govt of Maharashtra (1960): Kolhapur District Gazetteer
 Department of Gazetteer, Govt of Maharashtra (1964): Kolaba District Gazetteer
 Department of Gazetteer, Govt of Maharashtra (1982): Thane District Gazetteer
 A.S.Altekar (1936): The Silaharas of Western India.

External links
 Silver Coin of Shilaharas of Southern Maharashtra (Coinex 2006 - Souvenir)

Shilahara dynasty
9th-century rulers in Asia